Gagarin's Grandson is a 2007 Russian comedy film directed by Tamara Vladimirtseva and Andrey Panin.

Plot 
The film tells about the dark-skinned pupil Gena Gagarin, whom the artist Fyodor takes to his family. They have a hard way to learn to understand each other.

Cast 
 Done Lema as Gena
 Gennady Nazarov as Fyodor
 Andrey Panin as Tolyan
 Anastasiya Richi
 Natalya Rogozhkina as Greta
 Svetlana Skurikhina
 Elya Akmaeva		
 Stella Baranovskaya as Girl with a foreign car
 Dmitriy Georgrievskiy
 Anna Gromova

References

External links 
 

2007 films
2000s Russian-language films
Russian comedy films